Umberto D'Orsi (30 July 1929 – 31 August 1976)  was an Italian character actor and comedian.

Born in Trieste, D'Orsi took a degree in law in 1953, but he was already active in theater from 1950, performing in small companies of prose and revue. From 1962 till his death, D'Orsi was a prolific supporting actor, appearing in as many as fifteen films a year. He died in Rome at 47 from kidney failure.

Selected filmography 

 A Girl... and a Million (1962)  
 The Thursday (1963)  
 The Girl from Parma (1963)
 The Hours of Love (1963)  
 Shivers in Summer (1963) 
 The Verona Trial (1963) 
 Countersex (1964) 
 Let's Talk About Women (1964) 
 Me, Me, Me... and the Others (1965)  
 I soldi (1965)  
 Hot Frustrations (1965)  
 I complessi (1965)  
 Rita the American Girl (1965)  
 Death Walks in Laredo (1966) 
 Blockhead (1966)   
 Golden Chameleon (1967)
 The Black Sheep (1968)  
 The Two Crusaders (1968)
 Franco, Ciccio e il pirata Barbanera (1969)  
 I See Naked (1969)  
 Normal Young Man (1969)
 Circuito chiuso (1969) 
 Basta guardarla (1970)
 La ragazza del prete (1970)
 I due maghi del pallone (1970)
 Ma che musica maestro (1971)
 Oasis of Fear (1971)
 Who Killed the Prosecutor and Why? (1972) 
 My Name Is Shanghai Joe (1972) 
 Ubalda, All Naked and Warm (1972) 
 Return of Halleluja (1972)
 Naughty Nun (1972) 
 Snow Job (1972) 
 Man Called Invincible (1973)
 Holy God, Here Comes the Passatore! (1973)
 The Balloon Vendor (1974)  
 L'arbitro (1972) 
 The Sensual Man (1974)

References

External links 

 

Italian male film actors
1929 births
Actors from Trieste
1976 deaths
20th-century Italian male actors